Turn Your Radio On may refer to:

 "Hello (Turn Your Radio On)", a song by the British-based pop duo Shakespears Sister
 Turn Your Radio On, a radio program broadcast on WFAY-AM
 "Turn Your Radio On", a song written by Albert E. Brumley
 "Turn Your Radio On", the Albert E. Brumley song on John Hartford's 1971 album Aereo-Plain
 "Turn Your Radio On", the Albert E. Brumley song on Merle Haggard's 1971 album The Land of Many Churches
 "Turn Your Radio On", the Albert E. Brumley song on Randy Travis' 2003 album Worship & Faith
 "Turn Your Radio On", the Albert E. Brumley song on Cledus T. Judd's 2007 album Boogity, Boogity – A Tribute to the Comedic Genius of Ray Stevens
 Turn Your Radio On (album), Ray Stevens' eighth studio album featuring and named for Albert E. Brumley's song
 Turn Your Radio On, a 1993 album by James Blackwood
 Turn Your Radio On, a 1993 album by Bill & Gloria Gaither
 Turn Your Radio On, a 2009 album by Pete Fidler
 Turn Your Radio On, a 1973 album by The Blackwood Brothers
 Turn Your Radio On, a 2008 BBC radio documentary produced by Hilary Robinson

See also
 Turn on Your Radio, the sixth and final studio album by the Italian/U.S. ensemble Change